The 2004–05 NCAA Division I men's basketball season began on November 10, 2004, progressed through the regular season and conference tournaments, and concluded with the 2005 NCAA Division I men's basketball tournament championship game on April 4, 2005 at the Edward Jones Dome in Saint Louis, Missouri. The North Carolina Tar Heels won their fourth NCAA national championship with a 75–70 victory over the Illinois Fighting Illini.

Season headlines 
 The preseason AP All-American team was named on November 9. Chris Paul of Wake Forest was the leading vote-getter (55 of 72 votes). The rest of the team included Lawrence Roberts of Mississippi State (50 votes), Wayne Simien of Kansas (50), Julius Hodge of NC State (41) and Hakim Warrick of Syracuse (33).

Season outlook

Pre-season polls 
The top 25 from the AP and ESPN/USA Today Coaches Polls November 11, 2004.

Conference membership changes 

These schools joined new conferences for the 2004–05 season.

Regular season

Conference winners and tournaments 

30 conference seasons conclude with a single-elimination tournament. Traditionally, all conference schools are eligible, regardless of record. However, some conferences, most notably the Big East, do not invite the teams with the worst records. The conference tournament winner receives an automatic bid to the NCAA Tournament. A school that wins the conference regular season title is guaranteed an NIT bid; however, it may receive an at-large bid to the NCAA Tournament. The Ivy League is the only Division I conference that does not hold a conference tournament, instead sending their regular-season champion.

Statistical leaders 

* Coleman and Funn tied for the national assists lead. Each player had 224 assists in 28 games.

Post-season tournaments

NCAA tournament 

The NCAA Tournament tipped off on March 15, 2005 with the opening round game in Dayton, Ohio, and concluded on April 4 at the Edward Jones Dome in St. Louis, MO. A total of 65 teams entered the tournament. Thirty of the teams earned automatic bids by winning their conference tournaments. The automatic bid of the Ivy League, which does not conduct a post-season tournament, went to its regular season champion. The remaining 34 teams were granted "at-large" bids, which are extended by the NCAA Selection Committee. The Big East Conference led the way with eight bids. North Carolina won their fourth NCAA title, beating Illinois 75–70 in the final. North Carolina forward Sean May was named the tournament's Most Outstanding Player.

Final Four – St. Louis, Missouri – Edward Jones Dome

National Invitation tournament 

After the NCAA Tournament field was announced, the National Invitation Tournament invited 32 teams to participate, reducing the field's size from 40. Eight teams were given automatic bids for winning their conference regular seasons, and 24 other teams were also invited. Dave Odom's South Carolina Gamecocks won the title, defeating the Saint Joseph's Hawks 60–57 in the championship game. The Gamecocks' Carlos Powell was named tournament MVP.

NIT Semifinals & Final

Award winners

Consensus All-American teams

Major player of the year awards 

 Wooden Award: Andrew Bogut, Utah
 Naismith Award: Andrew Bogut, Utah
 Associated Press Player of the Year: Andrew Bogut, Utah
 NABC Player of the Year: Andrew Bogut, Utah
 Oscar Robertson Trophy (USBWA): Andrew Bogut, Utah
 Adolph Rupp Trophy: JJ Redick, Duke
 CBS/Chevrolet Player of the Year: Andrew Bogut, Utah
 Sporting News Player of the Year: Dee Brown, Illinois

Major freshman of the year awards 

 USBWA Freshman of the Year: Marvin Williams, North Carolina
 Sporting News Freshman of the Year: Marvin Williams, North Carolina

Major coach of the year awards 

 Associated Press Coach of the Year: Bruce Weber, Illinois
 Henry Iba Award (USBWA): Bruce Weber, Illinois
 NABC Coach of the Year: Bruce Weber, Illinois
 Naismith College Coach of the Year: Bruce Weber, Illinois
 CBS/Chevrolet Coach of the Year: Bruce Weber, Illinois
 Adolph Rupp Cup: Bruce Weber, Illinois
 Sporting News Coach of the Year: Bruce Weber, Illinois

Other major awards 

 Bob Cousy Award (Best point guard): Raymond Felton, North Carolina
 Pete Newell Big Man Award (Best big man): Andrew Bogut, Utah
 NABC Defensive Player of the Year: Shelden Williams, Duke
 Frances Pomeroy Naismith Award (Best player under 6'0): Nate Robinson, Washington
 Lowe's Senior CLASS Award (top senior): Wayne Simien, Kansas
 Robert V. Geasey Trophy (Top player in Philadelphia Big 5): Pat Carroll, St. Joseph's
 NIT/Haggerty Award (Top player in New York City metro area): Keydren Clark, Saint Peter's
 Chip Hilton Player of the Year Award (Strong personal character): Ronald Ross, Texas Tech

Coaching changes 
A number of teams changed coaches throughout the season and after the season ended.

References